Graham Whittle (born 30 May 1953) is an English former professional footballer who played as a striker.

Career
Born in Liverpool, Whittle played for Hartshill Boys Cub, Wrexham and Bangor City. While at Wrexham, he was Player of the Season for the 1976–77 season.

References

1953 births
Living people
English footballers
Wrexham A.F.C. players
Bangor City F.C. players
English Football League players
Association football forwards